Oba (Dr) Michael Folorunsho Segun Olobayo (4 March 1945 – 15 May 2016) was born to the Ajinuhi Royal House of the Ilajo clan on 4 March 1945. Oba Michael Olobayo was the Chairman of Okun Area Traditional Council. He had his early upbringing in Kabba community in Okun land where he attended St Mary’s Primary Catholic School. He completed his primary education and gained admission into St Augustine’s College Kabba in 1959.{I think there is a mistake in his secondary school. I remember vividly that Michael Olobayo was at Government College Keffi. Keffi is now in Nassarawa State but at that time it was part of Benue Province of Northern Region of Nigeria. That was how I got to know Michael Olobayo. Government College Keffi was then one of three model secondary schools of Northern Nigeria to which children from all the province were sent. I was admitted to the school in 1962 and met Michael Olobayo in form four. I do not think he attended St. Augustine's College Kabba as claimed in this write-up.) He had his higher school certificate (HSC) at St John’s College Kaduna. He was very athletic while in school and participated in several sports. He was the fastest runner in St John's College Kaduna and was named VC-10 after the fastest time in those days. He graduated from the prestigious Ahmadu Bello University with B.A Hons in History in 1970.

Oba Michael Olobayo started his career in the civil service as Press Secretary in the Ministry of Information in Kwara State. From there he moved onto Government House and became the Chief of Protocol to the then Governor of Kwara State Colonel David Bamigboye. He later moved to the Ministry of Transport and Lands. It was at the Ministry of Transport and Lands he was called to ascend the throne of his forefathers in 1985 as the Obaro of Kabba. He was only forty (40) years old.  His grandfather was the Obaro Ero I of Kabba, the reason why Oba Michael Olobayo is the Obaro Ero II.

Oba Michael Olobayo was a man of peace and his reign witnessed a lot of progress and development in telecommunication, education and commercial sectors. Many sons and daughters of the land felt free come back home and invest.

In 1998, he was presented the prestigious National honours Officer of the Order of the Niger OON by the Head of State, General Olusegun Obasanjo.

Oba Michael Olobayo ruled for thirty years and seven months before he died after a brief illness on 15 May 2016.

1945 births
2016 deaths
Ahmadu Bello University alumni
Nigerian royalty
Officers of the Order of the Niger